The Lucknow College of Arts and Crafts (LCAC), also known as the Government College of Arts and Crafts (GCAC) or simply the College of Arts and Crafts (CAC), was founded in 1911. It is affiliated to University of Lucknow. Sri 
Ratan Kumar is principal of the college.

History

The school was established as the School of Industrial Design on 1 November 1892. Initially located at Wingfield Manzil, it moved to Aminabad and later to Baans Mandi. A purpose-built structure was started in 1909 and inaugurated in 1911. Nathanial Herd was the first principal. The school was renamed as Government College School of Arts and Crafts in 1917.

The Indian school of painting was brought to the curriculum in 1925, and graphic arts courses were introduced in 1963. Former principal Jai Kishan Agarwal received the International Print Biannale Florence Italy award in 1974. In 1975 the college merged with the University of Lucknow as a constituent college and its three National diploma courses were converted into degree courses.

Departments

The college has following departments:
Department of Fine Art,
Department of Commercial Art,
Department of Sculpture
Department of Art Master’s Training

Courses offered

Undergraduate programmes 

 Bachelor of Visual Art: Painting, Applied Art, or Sculpture
 BFA in Textile Design 
 BFA in Indian Traditional Sculpture

Postgraduate programmes 

 Master in Visual Art (Painting) with specialisation in creative, portrait, landscape painting, printmaking, ceramics and mural.
 Master in Visual Art (Applied Art) with specialisation in visualisation, photography and illustration.
 Master in Visual Art (Sculpture) with specialisation in terracota/ceramic, portrait and life, bronze casting, stone carving.

Diploma programmes 

 Diploma in Art Masters Training 
 Diploma in Home Art and Home Craft 
 Diploma in Furniture Design and Interior Decoration 
 Diploma in Iron and Heavy Metal Work 
 Diploma in Wood Work

Museum of College of Arts And Crafts

The College is home to an arts and crafts museum, founded in 1911.

Notable alumni
Juhi Chaturvedi
Surendra Pal Joshi, artist known for paintings, sculptures and murals
Bhimsain
Iftekhar
 Sukumar Bose
 Lalit Mohan Sen
 Hashim Akhtar Naqvi

See also
Government College of Architecture
Bhartendu Academy of Dramatic Arts
Bhatkhande Sanskriti Vishwavidyalaya

References

External links
 College of Arts and Crafts at University of Lucknow, Lucknow
 Centenary Twins: Arts College, Lucknow Designing Future, EXPRESS FEATURES SERVICE, Posted: Fri 6 August 2010, 02:54 hrs

Art schools in India
Educational institutions established in 1911
Universities and colleges in Lucknow
University of Lucknow
1911 establishments in India